Fortisip is a therapeutic food manufactured/produced by Nutricia. It is a ready-made milkshake style drink meant for consumption by people who cannot consume enough solid food to maintain a balanced diet and is also suitable for people with eating disorders. Fortisip is suitable for use as a sole source of nutrients for most people over 6 years of age, but it contains no fibre.

Fortisip contains proteins and the vitamins, minerals and trace elements needed for a nutritionally complete diet. Each 200 ml Fortisip bottle provides 300 Kcal (1260 kJ). It does not contain gluten or lactose, making it suitable for people with coeliac disease or lactose intolerance. It is not suitable for people with galactosemia, or as a partial source of nutrition for children under the age of 3.

Fortisip is available in neutral, apricot, mocha, vanilla, strawberry, orange, banana, tropical fruits, chocolate and caramel flavours.

It is also offered in a 'Compact Fibre' Version to offer a greater fibre intake across a person's diet. Expanding its range, Nutricia now offer fortisip in pudding formulations (forticreme), Fortisip Yogurt Style & Fortijuice; with some differences to vitamins and fats contained in the different styles. 

The high sugar content can cause accelerated tooth decay in frail elderly patients.  These patients should have preventive dentistry in conjunction with Fortisip.

See also
 Therapeutic food
 Dietary supplement
 Nutrition disorder

References

External links
 Information about Fortisip

Dietary supplements